The International Association for Professional Base Ball Players, commonly known as the  International Association, was the name for two separate Canadian-American professional baseball leagues that first operated during 1877–1878 (plus an additional two seasons under a different name) and later operated during 1888–1890.

International Association of 1877–1878
The Association's by-laws and constitution required member teams to pay $10 to join the league (plus an additional $15 to compete for the championship) and fan admission was set at 25 cents. Visiting teams were guaranteed $75, plus half of the gate receipts when they exceeded that amount ($75).

Pitcher Candy Cummings was the first president of the International Association, while also a player for the Lynn Live Oaks of Massachusetts in 1877.

Jimmy Williams of Columbus served as the league's first Secretary.

1877 season
In 1877, the International Association featured teams based in: 
 London, Ontario, Canada (London Tecumsehs) 
 Pittsburgh, Pennsylvania (Pittsburgh Allegheny)
 Rochester, New York (The Rochesters) 
 Manchester, New Hampshire (The Manchesters) 
 Columbus, Ohio (Columbus Buckeyes) 
 Guelph, Ontario, Canada (Guelph Maple Leafs) 
 Lynn, Massachusetts (Lynn Live Oaks)

Final standings
Final standings of the 1877 season:
London Tecumsehs 14-4-2*
Pittsburgh Allegheny 13-6-0 
Rochester (The Rochesters), NY 10-8-0 
Manchester (The Manchesters), NH 9-10-0 
Columbus Buckeyes 9-11-2 
Guelph Maple Leafs 4-12-0 
Lynn (Massachusetts) Live Oaks 1-9-0 * disbanded

Fred Goldsmith, London's star pitcher, had a 14–4 record in 193 innings pitched with three shutouts, during International Association play in 1877.

1878 season
In 1878, the league lost two teams - Guelph and Columbus - however, it added the Binghamton Crickets, Hornellsville Hornells and Syracuse Stars. The cities of Buffalo, New York, Hartford, Connecticut, Lowell, Massachusetts, New Bedford, Massachusetts, New Haven, Connecticut, Springfield, Massachusetts and Worcester, Massachusetts also had representatives. Buffalo finished in first place.

Bud Fowler, the first known African-American player in organized baseball, pitched for the Lynn club in 1878.

Transformation and hiatus
The Buffalo Bisons, winners of the 1878 pennant, and the Syracuse Stars seriously hurt the International Association's chances at major league status when they joined the rival National League for the 1879 season. At the same time, the London Tecumsehs dropped out of the league, causing it to be renamed the National Base Ball Association entering the 1879 season. Under that name, it played through the 1880 season before dissolving.

The league did not operate from 1881 to 1887.

International Association of 1888–1890

In 1888, outfielder Patsy Donovan of the London Tecumsehs led the league in batting with a batting average of either .359 (according to the Donovan family web site) or .398 (according to the London Tecumsehs' official scorer C. J. Moorehead in a 1903 copy of The London Advertiser), had 201 hits, scored 103 runs and stole 80 bases. His second season with the Tecumsehs was less successful due to a leg injury. Donovan went on to an outstanding career in Major League Baseball, even playing a significant role in scouting Babe Ruth.

Teams
The following teams played in the second incarnation of the league, which existed from 1888 until 1890:

 Albany Governors (1890)
 Buffalo Bisons (1888–1890)
 Detroit Wolverines (1889–1890)
 Hamilton Mountaineers (1888, 1890)
 Hamilton Hams (1889)
 London Tecumsehs (1888–1890)
 Montreal Canadiens (1890)
 Grand Rapids Shamrocks (1890)
 Rochester Jingoes (1888–1889)
 Saginaw-Bay City Hyphens (1890)
 Syracuse Stars (1888–1889)
 Toledo Black Pirates (1889)
 Toronto Canucks (1888–1890)
 Troy Trojans (1888)

In 1888, Syracuse finished in first place. Detroit finished in first place in 1889 and 1890.

Legacy
Some baseball historians consider the International Association the first minor league; others point out that the league was conceived as a rival to the National League, now thought of as the sole major league of the era. Statistics of players who competed in the International Association and other early non-major leagues, such as the New England League, are grouped as "Other" by the Baseball-Reference.com reference site. The Northwestern League of 1883–1884 is regarded as the first true minor league.

Sources
 The Northern Game: Baseball the Canadian Way by Bob Elliott (Sport Classic, 2005).
 Heritage Baseball: City of London a souvenir program from July 23, 2005, celebrating the history of Labatt Park and London, Ontario's 150th anniversary as an incorporated city.
 Boys of Summer: Knute, Boot, Milky and Buck by Don Maudsley (SCENE magazine, London, Ontario, June 15, 2000).
 The magic continues at London's Field of Dreams by Barry Wells (SCENE magazine, London, Ontario, June 15, 2000).
 Canada's Baseball Capital Celebrates 143rd Year by William Humber (page 36 of the London Majors Baseball Club, 1998 Souvenir Program). 
 Diamonds of the North: A Concise History of Baseball in Canada by William Humber (Oxford University Press, 1995).
 The Beaver, Exploring Canada's History, Baseball's Canadian Roots: Abner Who? by Mark Kearney (October–November 1994).
 'The 1948 London Majors: A Great Canadian Team by Dan Mendham (unpublished academic paper, UWO, December 7, 1992).
 Diamond Rituals: Baseball in Canadian Culture by Robert K. Barney, (Meckler Books, 1989).
 Journal of Sport History, A Critical Examination of a Source in Early Ontario Baseball: The Reminiscence of Adam E. Ford by UWO Professor Robert K. Barney and Nancy Bouchier (Vol. 15, No. 1, Spring 1988).
 Who's Who in Canadian Sport by Bob Ferguson, (Summerhill Press Ltd., 1985).
 Cheering for the Home Team: The Story of Baseball in Canada by William Humber, (The Boston Mills Press, 1983).
 Old Time Baseball and the London Tecumsehs of the late 1870s by Les Bronson, a recorded (and later transcribed) talk given to the London & Middlesex Historical Society on February 15, 1972. Available in the London Room of the London Public Library, Main Branch.
 Bill Stern's Favorite Baseball Stories by Bill Stern, (Blue Ribbon Books, Garden City, New York, 1949).

References

Further reading
 Evolution of a National Pastime, Canadians at Bat for their Place in History by William Humber
 1876 and 1877 Bryce Baseball Guides
 The 1877 Rochesters of the International Association
"Patsy Donovan is remembered for a stellar season with the Tecumsehs" by James Reaney, The London Free Press, August 13, 2006

Defunct minor baseball leagues in the United States
Defunct baseball leagues in Canada
Sports leagues established in 1878
Sports leagues disestablished in 1879
Sports leagues established in 1888
Sports leagues disestablished in 1890